Isabella Micheli (born 30 March 1962) is an Italian former ice dancer. She competed in the ice dance event at the 1984 Winter Olympics.

References

External links
 

1962 births
Living people
Italian female ice dancers
Olympic figure skaters of Italy
Figure skaters at the 1984 Winter Olympics
Sportspeople from Como